Octavio Robles (born 16 January 1963) is a Mexican boxer. He competed in the men's light welterweight event at the 1984 Summer Olympics.

References

1963 births
Living people
Mexican male boxers
Olympic boxers of Mexico
Boxers at the 1984 Summer Olympics
Place of birth missing (living people)
Light-welterweight boxers